Lalbir Chaudhary is a Nepalese politician and father of Resham Lal Chaudhary, the founder of Nagrik Unmukti Party. He was elected in 2022 from Bardiya 2 to the House of Representatives.

Though being a member of Nagrik Unmukti Party, Chaudhary had to contest election as independent after his son's candidacy was denied.

References 

Living people
Nagrik Unmukti Party politicians
Nepal MPs 2022–present
1955 births